Xyleutes terrafirma is a moth in the family Cossidae. It was described by William Schaus in 1911 and is found in Costa Rica.

References

Xyleutes
Moths described in 1911